Sébastien Leclerc (born 28 March 1970) is a French politician and member of The Republicans. In June 2017, he was elected to serve as Deputy for the 3rd constituency of Calvados in the French National Assembly. He was elected mayor of Lisieux on 28 June 2020.

See also
 French legislative elections 2017

References

1970 births
Living people
Deputies of the 15th National Assembly of the French Fifth Republic
People from Lisieux
Mayors of places in Normandy
The Republicans (France) politicians